Jeanette Clare Chippington,  (née Esling; born 21 April 1970) is a British Paralympic swimmer and paracanoeist. Chippington has represented Great Britain at seven Paralympics, five in swimming Summer Paralympics, 1988 Seoul, 1992 Barcelona, 1996 Atlanta, Sydney 2000 and Athens 2004. Competing as a S6 classification swimmer she favoured mainly 50 m and 100m freestyle competitions. After retiring from swimming Chippington returned to disability sport, becoming a world class paracanoeist, winning gold at the 2016 Summer Paralympics and bronze at  2020 Tokyo Paralympics.

Personal history
Chippington was born Jeanette Clare Esling in 1970 in Taplow, England. In 1982 she contracted a virus which resulted in damage to her spinal cord which in turn left her paralysed in both legs. She married in 1998, flying from her honeymoon to compete in the IPC Swimming World Championships in New Zealand. She has two children and also works as a swimming instructor and coach.

Swimming career
Chippington started swimming on the recommendation of her physiotherapist after her illness. She entered her first major competition in 1985 and despite originally participating in all four major competitive strokes, she settled as a 50m and 100m freestyle specialist. In 1988 she made the Great Britain team for the Summer Paralympics in Seoul entering the women's 100m backstroke and freestyle L4 events. There she finished in second place in the 100m freestyle to win her first Paralympic medal. Chippington represented Great Britain four years later at the 1992 Summer Paralympics in Barcelona. There she entered six events, taking a medal in one, a bronze in the women's Women's 4x50 m Medley S1-6, alongside team mates Tara Flood, Margaret McEleny and Jane Stidever.

The 1996 Summer Paralympics were Chippington's most successful with a five medal haul. She won two gold medals, setting world records in both. In the Women's 4 x 100-metre medley relay she was reunited with McEleny and Stidver while new member Jennifer Booth was added to the last leg. The team finished in a time of 2:52.36 setting a new world record and taking gold. Her second gold medal was in the 100m freestyle S6. In the heats Jenny Newstead of New Zealand finished as fastest qualifier in a world record time of 1:23.85, while Chippington qualified third. Despite the strong competition, Chippington won the final by swimming 1:23:63 beating Newstead's short lived record in the process. She completed the Atlanta games with a silver in the 50 m freestyle S6 and two bronze medals in the 200 m freestyle S6 and 4x50 m medley relay S1-6.

The 2000 Summer Paralympics in Sydney saw Chippington add another four Paralympic medals to her tally; a silver in the Women's 4 × 100 m medley relay 34 pts and three further bronze medals. Her final Paralympics as a swimmer was the 2004 Games in Athens. Despite believing she was not good enough to qualify for the Games, Chippington still left with another medal, a bronze in the 4x50m freestyle relay 20pts.

Paracanoeing career
Chippington took up paracanoeing after being nagged by a friend to try out the sport. In 2013, she won three gold medals at the ICF Canoe Sprint World Championships in Duisburg, but later decided to focus on the KL1 200m event when it was announced that only Kayaks in her disability classification would be included in the 2016 Summer Paralympics in Rio. At the 2015 ICF Canoe Sprint World Championships held in Milan, Chippington won gold in the KL1 200m, giving her a qualifying place for the 2016 Games in Rio.

Chippington was appointed Member of the Order of the British Empire (MBE) in the 2017 New Year Honours for services to canoeing and Officer of the Order of the British Empire (OBE) in the 2022 New Year Honours, also for services to canoeing.

References

External links
 

1970 births
Living people
People from Taplow
English female swimmers
British female freestyle swimmers
British female canoeists
Paralympic swimmers of Great Britain
Paracanoeists of Great Britain
Paralympic medalists in swimming
Paralympic medalists in paracanoe
Paralympic gold medalists for Great Britain
Paralympic silver medalists for Great Britain
Paralympic bronze medalists for Great Britain
Swimmers at the 1988 Summer Paralympics
Swimmers at the 1992 Summer Paralympics
Swimmers at the 1996 Summer Paralympics
Swimmers at the 2000 Summer Paralympics
Swimmers at the 2004 Summer Paralympics
Medalists at the 1988 Summer Paralympics
Medalists at the 1992 Summer Paralympics
Medalists at the 1996 Summer Paralympics
Medalists at the 2000 Summer Paralympics
Medalists at the 2004 Summer Paralympics
Medalists at the 2016 Summer Paralympics
Officers of the Order of the British Empire
ICF Canoe Sprint World Championships medalists in paracanoe
S6-classified Paralympic swimmers
20th-century British women